The Preparatory Committee for an Arms Trade Treaty, known as PrepCom, will meet a total of four times; they have already met twice.  The first PrepCom occurred from July 12 to July 23, 2010, at the United Nations in New York City. The second PrepCom occurred from February 28 to March 4, 2011, also in New York City.  A third meeting is scheduled for July, 2011.  The preparatory committees were designed to prepare member states, international organizations and non-governmental organizations for the Arms Trade Treaty negotiation in 2012. The Preparatory Committees are intended to prepare delegates and non-governmental organizations for the eventual Arms Trade Treaty negotiations, and is concerned with logistical, procedural and thematic issues.

History 
Countries in the United Nations have long been concerned about the lack of a global normative framework for guiding and governing international arms transfers. After years of international campaigning from individuals and states, the United Nations General Assembly voted in 2006 to negotiate an Arms Trade Treaty in 2012.

When delegates of the United Nations decided that they would negotiate an Arms Trade Treaty in 2012, there emerged a sentiment to host a series of preparatory conferences for member states and civil society to arrange and organize the eventual negotiations. In order to do this, four preparatory committees (or “PrepComs”) were scheduled.

The first PrepCom occurred from July 12 to July 23 in 2010 at the United Nations in New York City. The 2010 PrepCom featured an opening statement from the high representative for disarmament affairs. The eventual outcomes of the 2010 PrepCom were the establishment of an outline for a draft Treaty, draft preamble, draft goals and objectives and three papers from the Friends of the chair on scope, parameters and implementation of the eventual Arms Trade Treaty.

The third preparatory Committee will take place in July, 2011.

In addition to the four Preparatory Committees, a Group of Governmental Experts was assembled to debate and discuss potential challenges facing an Arms Trade Treaty.

Participants 
The second PrepCom was attended by member states of the United Nations, non-governmental organizations, and international organizations. These participants were tasked with addressing the potential scope and parameters for an Arms Trade Treaty. The PrepCom conference was held in the United Nations Building in New York City.

Preparatory Documents 

The second PrepCom issued two definitive preparatory documents prior to the opening of the conference. Both a Provisional Agenda and a Provisional Programme of Work were issued and disseminated to PrepCom participants. These documents outlined the logistical timeline for the conference.

Statements and Outcomes 
The second PrepCom had several key issues that it was tasked to address. Scope, criteria and parameters, and international cooperation and assistance were all given a full day of statements.  The international organization Control Arms Coalition made a presentation. The chair, Roberto García Moritán, issued three papers on scope, criteria and parameters, and international cooperation and assistance; the chair also issued a draft paper.

References 
“Towards an International Arms Trade Treaty” UK Arms Control and Disarmament, UK Permanent Representative to the conference on Disarmament, February 22, 2011. https://web.archive.org/web/20110831203707/http://ukunarmscontrol.fco.gov.uk/en/the-uk-disarmament/armstradetreaty

“What is the issue”, Arms Trade Treaty Preparatory Committee, United Nations, 2011. http://www.un.org/disarmament/convarms/ATTPrepCom/index.htm

“Provisional Agenda, A/CONF.217/PC.II/L.1”, Preparatory Committee for the United Nations Conference on the Arms Trade Treaty, United Nations General Assembly, February 14, 2011.

“Provisional Programme of Work, A/CONF.217/PC.II/L.2”, Preparatory Committee for the United Nations Conference on the Arms Trade Treaty, United Nations General Assembly, February 14, 2011.

“Second Preparatory Committee on the Arms Trade Treaty”, Reaching Critical Will, March, 2011. https://web.archive.org/web/20110408130942/http://www.reachingcriticalwill.org/legal/att/prepcom2/index.html

Arms control
Organizations established by the United Nations